Chiasmocleis antenori, also known as the Ecuador silent frog, is a species of frog in the family Microhylidae. It is found in eastern Ecuador, eastern Peru, and western Brazil (Acre). It might be a species complex.

Etymology 
Chiasmocleis antenori is named for Antenor Leitão de Carvalho.

Description
Adult males measure  and adult females  in snout–vent length. The snout is strongly projecting over the lower jaw in the lateral view, but somewhat truncate when view from above. The tympanum is distinct. The outermost fingers are rudimentary (some consider the first one to be absent); the remaining ones are bluntly rounded at the tips and have fleshy margins. Only four toes are evident; they bear small but distinct disks at the tips. Coloration is dark brown both dorsally and ventrally, flecked with small white spots that are more numerous and larger ventrally than dorsally.

Habitat and conservation
It can be found in both leaf litter and bromeliads. Breeding takes place in phytotelmata (leaf axils). The tadpoles are free-swimming but non-feeding. It is an uncommon species that can be locally threatened by habitat loss (including collection of bromeliads), but has an extensive range, occurs in several protected areas, and is not considered threatened overall.

References

antenori
Frogs of South America
Amphibians of Brazil
Amphibians of Ecuador
Amphibians of Peru
Amphibians described in 1973
Taxonomy articles created by Polbot